Mininco Formation is a geological formation composed of sediments that deposited during the Pliocene in central Chile. Near Angol the formation reaches thicknesses of up to 300 m. The upper strata of the formation contain tuff layers and coal beds that are rich in leaf fossils. Other fossils that have been found in the formation include fresh-water diatoms and bivalves.

References 

Geologic formations of Chile
Pliocene Series of South America
Neogene Chile
Conglomerate formations
Sandstone formations
Siltstone formations
Coal formations
Coal in Chile
Tuff formations
Geology of Araucanía Region
Geology of Biobío Region